Clemens Selzer (born ) is an Austrian male track cyclist, riding for the national team. He competed in the sprint and 1 km time trial event at the 2010 UCI Track Cycling World Championships.

References

External links
 Profile at cyclingarchives.com

1985 births
Living people
Austrian track cyclists
Austrian male cyclists
Place of birth missing (living people)